The Cambridge Bibliography of English Literature is an encyclopaedic bibliography of literature in English published by the Cambridge University Press.

It was first published in the 1940s, and a revised edition was issued from 1969 with the prefix New.

A third series was launched in 1999, without the prefix, but by 2022 only volume 4 had appeared.

First series
Volume I, 600–1660, ed. F. W. Bateson (1940)
Volume II, 1660–1800, ed. F. W. Bateson (1941)
Volume III, 1800–1900, ed. F. W. Bateson (1940)
Volume IV, Index, ed. F. W. Bateson (1940)
Volume V, Supplement: A.D. 600–1900, ed. George Watson (1940)

The New Cambridge Bibliography of English Literature
Volume 1, 600–1660, ed. George Watson (1974)
Volume 2, 1660–1800, ed. George Watson, Ian R. Willison, J. D. Pickles (1971)
Volume 3, 1800–1900, ed. George Watson (1969)
 Volume 4, 1900–1950, ed. George Watson, Ian Willison (1972)
Volume 5, Index, ed. George Watson, J. D. Pickles, Ian R. Willison (1977)

Third edition
Volume 4, 1800–1900, ed. Joanne Shattock (1999)

Concise series
 Concise Cambridge Bibliography of English Literature, ed. George Watson (1958)
 Concise Cambridge Bibliography of English Literature, 600–1950 ed. George Watson (1965)

Notes

Further reading
 George Watson, C.B.E.L.: the Making of the Cambridge Bibliography (Cambridge University Press, 1965)

Cultural history of the United Kingdom
Cultural history of England
Cultural history of Ireland
Cultural history of Scotland
Cultural history of Wales
Published bibliographies
Bibliographic databases and indexes